is a  Japanese philosopher, specializing in clinical philosophy and ethics. He was born in Kyoto, Japan, and is currently a professor at Otani University. He was the 16th president of Osaka University and served on the screening committee of the Jirō Osaragi Prize, and the Suntory Prize for Social Sciences and Humanities.

Chronology 
March 1972 - graduated from the Faculty of Letters, Kyoto University
April 1978 - lecturer at Kansai University
April 1992 - associate professor in the School of Letters, Osaka University
April 1996 - professor at the same school
August 2003 - dean of the School of Letters
August 2007 - 16th president of Osaka University
September 2011 - professor at Otani University

Awards 
Suntory Prize for Social Sciences and Humanities, History and Civilization (1989)
Kuwabarata Takeo Prize (2000)
Medal with Purple Ribbon from the Japanese government (2004)

Publications 
 .
 .

References

External links 
 Profile at Otani University website

Japanese philosophers
Academic staff of Osaka University
Kyoto University alumni
Academic staff of Kansai University
Academic staff of Ōtani University
1949 births
Living people